Noble High School is a public high school in North Berwick, Maine, United States serving students in grades 8-12 from the towns of Berwick, North Berwick, and Lebanon. NOBLE is an acronym for the three towns that NHS serves (NOrth Berwick, Berwick, and LEbanon).  Noble High School was a member of the Coalition of Essential Schools.

History
From 1969-2001, Noble High School was located at what is presently Noble Middle School. For the 32 years that NHS was located at this site, the school served the three towns. This site was suitable for a period, but as populations increased within the towns, NHS became very overcrowded. The school was designed for about 550 students, but by 1995 there were over 900 students in the school. As well as overcrowding issues, the facility was very outdated and did not accommodate the needs of the school. Due to the surrounding area, there was also a need for a community facility to serve the rural towns in the district. Pam Fisher, former NHS principal was very involved in the process of creating a new school. A committee of community members was created to plan for the new school.  The design of the school was highly influenced by the Principles of MSAD 60, and the Coalition of Essential Schools. The school opened in 2001.

Building

Noble High School was designed not only as a school but a community hub, for the three rural towns it serves. Within the walls of the facility, there are many opportunities for community events to proliferate. The 1000 seat Hussey Theatre, which has been used for theatrical productions, town meetings, and other events that require the use of the theatre. The School also has a 50-seat restaurant, named the Round Table. This functions as a part of the regional vocational program, where students learn to cook and operate a restaurant open to the community. Noble also has an early childhood education center that serves eight surrounding towns. The center is also part of the vocational program, and students learn about the fundamentals of childhood education. NHS is also home to Noble Adult & Community Education. Other facilities such as the library/media center, fitness facility, 2 gymnasiums, and a lecture hall are all available to be used by the community.

Noble High School has won many awards for the architecture of the building. NHS has received 13 awards for the design and functionality of the building. In 2002, the building was awarded the William W. Caudill Citation Award.

Athletics and activities

State sports championships 

Noble has won numerous state school sports championships. 
 
Baseball: 1971
Football: 1997, 1970, 1968
Girls Track: 1977
Wrestling: 2020, 2010, 2009, 1999-2006, 1986, 1985

Runner Up
Softball: 2003
Wrestling: 2007, 2008, 1998, 1995, 1993, 1984, 1981

Sportsmanship Awards
This award recognizes high schools sports teams that exemplify good sportsmanship.
Girls Basketball: 2009, 1992
 Wrestling: 2002

Demographics
 American Indian/Alaska Native: 0.1%
 Asian: 0.9%
 Native Hawaiian/Pacific Islander: 0.1%
 Hispanic: 2.6%
 Black, non-Hispanic: 0.5%
 White, non-Hispanic: 92%
 Two or More Races: 3.8%

References

External links
 
 MSAD/RSU #60  website

Public high schools in Maine
Schools in York County, Maine
Coalition of Essential Schools
North Berwick, Maine